White Township is a township in Kingman County, Kansas, USA.  As of the 2000 census, its population was 401.

Geography
White Township covers an area of 33.64 square miles (87.13 square kilometers). Lakes in this township include Lakin Lake.

Unincorporated towns
 Varner
(This list is based on USGS data and may include former settlements.)

Adjacent townships
 Roscoe Township, Reno County (north)
 Albion Township, Reno County (northeast)
 Galesburg Township (east)
 Dale Township (southeast)
 Ninnescah Township (south and southwest)
 Hoosier Township (west)
 Loda Township, Reno County (northwest)

Major highways
 U.S. Route 54

References
 U.S. Board on Geographic Names (GNIS)
 United States Census Bureau cartographic boundary files

External links
 US-Counties.com
 City-Data.com

Townships in Kingman County, Kansas
Townships in Kansas